American Samoa competed at the 2017 Asian Indoor and Martial Arts Games held in Ashgabat, Turkmenistan from September 17 to 27. 7 athletes represented American Samoa in 2 different sports during the event.

American Samoa made its debut in an Asian Indoor and Martial Arts Games event along with other Oceania nations.

Participants

References 

Nations at the 2017 Asian Indoor and Martial Arts Games
2017 in American Samoan sports